John Yeeden Lloyd (born 1795) was a member of the New Zealand Legislative Council from 31 December 1853. His last attendance was on 28 July 1854, but he was still listed as a member on 6 August 1855. He was reappointed on 4 October 1855, and served until 29 December 1857, when he resigned.

He was from Taranaki.

References  

1795 births
Year of death unknown
Members of the New Zealand Legislative Council